Senator Rath may refer to:

Fred J. Rath (1888–1968), New York State Senate
Mary Lou Rath (fl. 1970s–2000s), New York State Senate